Óshyrna is a mountain in the Westfjords in Iceland. It is the outermost part of the mountain slope between Ísafjörður and Bolungarvík. The old road to Bolungarvík lies between Óshyrna and the ocean. The Óshlíð  road is one of Iceland's most dangerous roads because of frequent avalanches and rock falls. The road has four emergency shelters along its route.

Sources 
 Oshlid

Mountains of Iceland